Sinner is the second solo studio album by an American rock musician Aaron Lewis of the nu metal band Staind. It was released on September 16, 2016, through Dot Records, and produced by Buddy Cannon. The first single, "That Ain't Country", was released on June 17, 2016, which coincided with the album announcement. To support the album, Lewis conducted a series of concerts titled "The Sinner Tour".

Commercial performance
Sinner debuted at number four on the US Billboard 200 with 42,000 units sold, 39,000 of which were traditional album sales. It also debuted at number one on the Top Country Albums chart. As of March 2018 the album has sold 146,800 copies in the United States.

Track listing

Personnel

 Sean R. Badum – assistant engineer
 Wyatt Beard – background vocals
 Jim "Moose" Brown – Hammond B-3 organ, piano, Wurlitzer
 Pat Buchanan – electric guitar
 Jake Burns – assistant engineer
 Buddy Cannon – background vocals
 Tony Castle – engineer, mixing
 Tony Creasman – drums
 Shannon Finnegan – production coordinator
 Paul Franklin – steel guitar
 Tom Freitag – assistant engineer
 Vince Gill – background vocals
 Kevin "Swine" Grantt – bass guitar
 Ted Jensen – mastering
 Ben Kitterman – dobro
 Alison Krauss – background vocals
 Jasper Lemaster – assistant engineer
 Aaron Lewis – lead vocals, background vocals
 Zoe Jane Lewis – background vocals, Lead Vocals on "Travelin' Soldier"
 Brent Mason – baritone guitar, electric guitar
 Seth Morton – assistant engineer
 Willie Nelson – duet vocals on "Sinner"
 Mickey Raphael – harmonica
 Matt Rausch – engineer
 Bobby Terry – acoustic guitar
 Dan Tyminski – acoustic guitar, mandolin, background vocals

Charts

Weekly charts

Year-end charts

References

2016 albums
Aaron Lewis albums
Dot Records albums
Albums produced by Buddy Cannon